Devpur may refer to any of the following places in India:

Telangana
 Devapur, Kasipet, a census town in Kasipet Mandal, Adilabad District

Karnataka
 Devapur, Bijapur, a village in Bijapur District
 Devapur, Gulbarga, a village in Gulbarga District
 Devapur, Yadgir, a panchayat village in Shorapur Taluka, Yadgir District